Forcas may refer to one of the two demons depicted in Ars Goetia and Pseudomonarchia Daemonum:
 Foras (Forcas, Forras, Forracis), President of Hell, commanding 29 legions of demons;
 Furcas (Forcas), Knight of Hell, commanding 20 legions of demons.